Jeong Keun-woo (Hanja: 鄭根宇; born October 2, 1982) is a second baseman and shortstop who currently plays for the LG Twins in the Korea Baseball Organization. He bats and throws right-handed.

Amateur career
Jeong attended Busan High School in Busan, South Korea. In 1999, he was selected for the South Korea national junior team and participated in the 1999 World Junior Baseball Championship held in Kaohsiung City, Taiwan. In 2000, he was selected again for the South Korea national junior team that won the 2000 World Junior Baseball Championship in Edmonton, Alberta, Canada. He led the attack alongside future pro baseball stars Choo Shin-soo, Kim Tae-kyun and Lee Dae-ho, batting .333 with 3 RBIs as a starting second baseman.

Upon leaving high school, Jeong was considered the top infielder prospect for the 2001 KBO Draft, but went undrafted. Instead, he played college baseball at Korea University.

In his sophomore year at Korea University, he made his first appearance for the South Korea national baseball team at the 2002 Intercontinental Cup, where they claimed the silver medal.

In November 2003, Jeong competed for the South Korean national team as an amateur player again in the 2003 Baseball World Cup. In the tournament, he batted .308 with 2 home runs and 10 RBIs, leading the team in RBI. In Team Korea's second game against Russia, he went 5-for-6 with a home run and 5 RBIs to lead his team to a 26-3 victory.

In 2004, as a senior he participated in the 2nd World University Baseball Championship and led his team to the bronze medal, winning the RBI title.

Notable international careers

Professional career
Drafted by the SK Wyverns in the second round (15th overall) of the 2005 KBO Draft, Jeong made his pro league debut on April 2, 2005. He had a disappointing rookie season, managing only a .193 batting average.

However, the next season he batted .284 with 45 stolen bases (2nd in the league) and 122 hits, and won the KBO League Golden Glove Award at second base. After the 2006 KBO season, Jeong was selected for the South Korea national team, and won a bronze medal at the 2006 Asian Games in Doha, Qatar.

Jeong had a .323 batting average (4th in the league) in the 2007 KBO season, the first season of a .300-plus batting average, leading his team to the Korean Series Championship. As a member of the South Korea national team, he competed in the 2007 Asian Baseball Championship and 2008 Final Olympic Qualification Tournament.

In the 2008 KBO season, Jeong hit .300-plus once again (.317), and ranked 2nd in hits (154) and 3rd in stolen bases (40).

On July 16, 2008, Jeong was selected for South Korea national team in the 2008 Olympics. In Beijing, he batted 9-for-29 with 4 runs and a RBI, playing as a utility infielder. In the team's third game of round-robin play against Canada, he smacked a solo home run off Mike Johnson in the third inning that held up for a 1-0 win for South Korea.

On December 11, 2009, he obtained his second Golden Glove Award as a second baseman, and in 2013 he won his third Golden Glove.

He moved through the second draft of the KBO League in 2020.

Awards and honors
2006 Golden Glove Award (Second baseman)
2009 Golden Glove Award (Second baseman)
2013 KBO Golden Glove 2nd prize
2016 1st place in KBO regular league

Career statistics
Through 2009 season.

Bold = led KBO

Notable international careers

Filmography

Television shows

See also 
 List of KBO career stolen bases leaders

References

External links 
Career statistics and player information from Korea Baseball Organization

Jeong Keun-woo at Hanwha Eagles Baseball Club 

Jeong Keun-woo Fancafe at Naver 

1982 births
2009 World Baseball Classic players
2013 World Baseball Classic players
2015 WBSC Premier12 players
Asian Games medalists in baseball
Baseball players at the 2006 Asian Games
Baseball players at the 2008 Summer Olympics
Baseball players at the 2010 Asian Games
Busan High School alumni
Hanwha Eagles players
KBO League second basemen
Korea University alumni
Living people
Medalists at the 2008 Summer Olympics
Olympic baseball players of South Korea
Olympic gold medalists for South Korea
Olympic medalists in baseball
SSG Landers players
South Korean baseball players
Sportspeople from Busan
Asian Games gold medalists for South Korea
Asian Games bronze medalists for South Korea
Medalists at the 2006 Asian Games
Medalists at the 2010 Asian Games